Kingswood railway station is located on the Main Western line, serving the Sydney suburb of Kingswood. It is served by Sydney Trains T1 Western line services.

History
Kingswood station opened on 1 September 1887 as Cross Roads, being renamed Kingswood on 3 October 1888.

In January 2020 upgrade works to the station were complete which included two new lifts, new bathrooms and an upgraded footbridge.

Platforms & services

Transport links
Kingswood station is served by one NightRide route:
N70: Penrith station to Town Hall station.

References

External links

Kingswood station details Transport for New South Wales

Easy Access railway stations in Sydney
Main Western railway line, New South Wales
Railway stations in Sydney
Railway stations in Australia opened in 1887